Stefanos Tsitsipas defeated Alex de Minaur in the final, 2–4, 4–1, 4–3(7–3), 4–3(7–3) to win the 2018 Next Generation ATP tennis finals. Chung Hyeon was the 2017 champion, but was ineligible to compete this year due to his age.

The 2018 Next Generation ATP Finals was a men's exhibition tennis tournament played in Milan, Italy, from 6 to 10 November 2018. It was the season-ending event for the best singles players who were age 21 and under on the 2018 ATP World Tour.

Prize money

 Undefeated champion | $407,000

Qualification
The top seven players in the Emirates ATP Race to Milan qualified. The eighth spot went to Italian wild card Liam Caruana, who won a national qualifying tournament. Eligible players had to be 21 or under at the start of the year (born in 1997 or later for 2018 edition). 19-year-old Alex de Minaur was the youngest and only teenage player.

Due to participation in the ATP Finals the following week, Alexander Zverev again withdrew from the tournament because of an injury, as did Denis Shapovalov, citing exhaustion.

Results

Final
  Stefanos Tsitsipas  def.  Alex de Minaur, 2–4, 4–1, 4–3(7–3), 4–3(7–3)

Third place match
  Andrey Rublev def.  Jaume Munar, 1–4, 4–3(7–4), 2–4, 4–2, 4–3(7–3)

Seeds

Draw

Finals

Group A

Group B

Standings are determined by: 1. number of wins; 2. number of matches; 3. in two-players-ties, head-to-head records; 4. in three-players-ties, percentage of sets won, then percentage of games won, then head-to-head records; 5. ATP rankings.

References

2018
2018 ATP World Tour
2018 Next Generation ATP Finals
2018 in Italian tennis
Sports competitions in Milan
2010s in Milan
Next Generation
2018 tennis exhibitions